On 28 May 2021, Scottish pensioner Esther Brown was raped and murdered at her flat in Woodlands, Glasgow.

Jason Graham (also known as Jason Evans), a registered sex offender, who was unknown to her, was found guilty of her rape and murder on 12 November 2021, and sentenced to 19 years in jail.

Perpetrator 
Jason Graham did not know Brown, and was a registered sex offender. He was aged 30 at the time he murdered and raped Brown. Graham legally changed his name to Jason Evans shortly before the attack.

Murder and trial 
Brown was kicked, punched and stamped on by Graham on 28 May 2021.

She was reported missing the same day and found dead on 1 June at her flat in Glasgow's Woodlands on West Princes Street.

On 7 June an arrest was made, Graham was charged, suspected of brutally killing the elderly woman in her own home. After killing her, he allegedly used Brown's bankcard to purchase cigarettes.

On 15 October 2021, Jason Graham pleaded guilty to the murder at the Justiciary Buildings in Glasgow On 17 November, he was found guilty to the murder and was sentenced to 19 years.

Response and wider influence 
A 2022 memorial is planned for Brown, in recognition of her community activism.

In March 2022, MSP Pauline McNeill called for changes to Clare's Law to account for perpetrators of crimes who change their names, specifically citing Graham's actions prior to the murder.

References 

2020s missing person cases
2021 in Scotland
2021 murders in the United Kingdom
Female murder victims
Formerly missing people
May 2021 events in the United Kingdom
Missing person cases in Scotland
Murder in Glasgow
Rape in Scotland
Violence against women in Scotland
2020s in Glasgow